The 2023 Zadar Open was a professional tennis tournament played on clay courts. It was the third edition of the tournament which was part of the 2023 ATP Challenger Tour. It took place in Zadar, Croatia between 20 and 26 March 2023.

Singles main-draw entrants

Seeds

 1 Rankings are as of 13 March 2022.

Other entrants
The following players received wildcards into the singles main draw:
  Duje Ajduković
  Mili Poljičak
  Dino Prižmić

The following players received entry from the qualifying draw:
  Mirza Bašić
  Giovanni Fonio
  Jeremy Jahn
  Julian Ocleppo
  David Pichler
  Giulio Zeppieri

The following player received entry as a lucky loser:
  Salvatore Caruso

Champions

Singles

 vs.

Doubles

 /  vs.  /

References

2023 ATP Challenger Tour
2023 in Croatian sport
March 2023 sports events in Europe